Planodema granulata is a species of beetle in the family Cerambycidae. It was described by Per Olof Christopher Aurivillius in 1928. It is known from South Africa, Somalia, and Zimbabwe.

References

Theocridini
Beetles described in 1928